Kuyumcu can refer to:

 Kuyumcu, Burhaniye
 Kuyumcu, Laçin
 Kuyumcu, Vezirköprü